Eddie Miró (born March 15, 1935 in Humacao, Puerto Rico), is a television show host in Puerto Rico of Sephardic origin. He is best known for being the host of Telemundo Puerto Rico's variety show El Show de las 12 (The 12 pm Show) for over 40 years. Like Dick Clark in the United States, Miró is known for longevity in front of the cameras while aging relatively little physically.

During the long television run of "El Show de las 12", he came into contact with many famous entertainers, both local and foreign. Some of the local celebrities he worked with as co-hosts and guest stars, were Nydia Caro, Luis Antonio Cosme, Awilda Carbia, Ángela Meyer, Otilio Warrington, Dagmar, Lou Briel, the members of El Gran Combo and Menudo, Machuchal and others. Foreign acts that he presented included Raphael, Celia Cruz, Julio Iglesias, Rocío Jurado, Sandro de América, Marilyn Pupo, (who resides in Puerto Rico but is Cuban) Gloria Trevi, José Luis Rodríguez,  Hugo Henríquez and many others.

In Puerto Rico's competitive television market, Miró outlasted rival hosts Luis Vigoreaux and his son Luisito of WAPA-TV, and, later on, Televicentro competition such as Luis Antonio Rivera ("Yoyo Boing"), who were among the hosts of El Show de las 12s main competitor, El Show del Mediodia (The Midday Show). It should be mentioned that Eddie Miró outlasted Luis Vigoreaux in part because of Vigoreaux's murder in 1983.

On June 13, 2022, Miro received an Emmy golden circle award for his 50 years trajectory on Puerto Rican television in a ceremony where Sylvia Gomez, Luz Nereida Vélez and Cyd Marie Fleming were also honored for their respective careers.

Early career
Miró grew up in the Santurce area of San Juan. In 1953, he graduated from high school as one of the "most likely to succeed" students (his school picked more than one student for that title; Miró was chosen in the entertainment area).

At the University level, Eddie graduated from surveyor, but was recruited by the United States Army where he served from 1958 to 1960 as a specialist in the Army Medical Corps. Upon completion of his military commitment, Eddie Miró thought to pursue a career in medicine. He also served with the Puerto Rico Air State Guard 1st Air Base Group. 

Miró began in the entertainment business as a singer, writer and comedian. His big break in the entertainment business came in 1964, when the actor turned television producer Paquito Cordero offered him a job as the host of El Show de las 12, a new program that was about to begin at Telemundo, then known as "Telemundo channel 2". El Show de las 12 first broadcast in January 1965.

He was a teen idol across Puerto Rico for the next few years. He utilized his abilities as a comic during the show as well, mixing them with his work as show host. His style also gained him acclaim among Puerto Rico's television critics.

Other shows
Miró expanded his career as a show host during the 1960s, 1970s and 1980s, hosting shows produced by Paquito Cordero, such as Noche de Gala, (Gala Night Ball), Salsa, Sabado en la Noche ("Salsa, Saturday at Night"), and Adelante Juventud ("Come Forward, Youth!"). He also worked with hosts such as, Marisol Malaret, and Deborah Carthy-Deu, among others.

During the 1980s, El Show de las 12s opening consisted of a cartoon version of Eddie Miró dancing salsa and smiling. In 1989, the show included a section in which he shared gossip with Kobbo Santarrosa's doll, "La Condesa del Bochinche" ("The Countess of Gossip"), a doll which preluded Santarrosa's current doll, "La Comay".
 
The "Condesa" doll always had a segment within El Show de las 12 and was the most-watched part of the program, so much so that its popularity prompted the doll, by then known as "La Comay", to have its own show titled Xclusivo with Miro as the host.  The show was successful throughout the 1990s until Santarrosa jumped ship to WAPA-TV in 1999.  Santarrosa intended to bring Eddie Miró with him to co-host the show, now renamed SuperXclusivo but Miro's was very loyal to Telemundo and Paquito Cordero therefore, he rejected the offer.

Miro was one of the very few local figures to have never worked for any other network than Telemundo until 2010, when he was hired by Puerto Rico TV, now called "WIPR-TV", to host a show named El Show de Eddie Miro, and later, in 2014, as a comedian for some sketches on WAPA America's El Tiempo Es Oro.

Family
Eddie Miró married choreographer Ita Medina on August 28, 1965 at the Los Angeles Church in Carolina, Puerto Rico. Miró's daughters, Dana Miró Medina, Michelle Miró Medina, and Christie Miró Medina, went on to have careers in the entertainment business as actresses, show hosts and producers. Perhaps ironically, Dana  married Luisito Vigoreaux during the 1990s, linking Miró with the family of his old competitor, Luis Vigoreaux.

Illness and tax problems
In 2003, Eddie Miró was diagnosed with colon cancer. He refused to take time off work, keeping on his daily schedule of hosting "El Show de las 12" even as he had cancer.

Former Puerto Rico governor Rafael Hernández Colón's spouse, and Raymond Dalmau became spokespersons for the testing and prevention of colon cancer in Puerto Rico once Miró announced his recovery.

In January 2005, shortly after celebrating forty years of El Show de las 12 on the air, Eddie Miró was told the show could not continue on longer, due in part to the changes in Telemundo Puerto Rico's production department. The usually-cool Miró went on a radio station and angrily declared that he was not rich, calling Telemundo Puerto Rico's producer, Tony Mojena, the station's "golden boy". He and his wife Juanita "Ita" Medina, a former dancer and choreographer, were later charged with tax evasion by the Puerto Rico Department of the Treasury. After a plea bargain, Miró pled guilty to a minor tax evasion charge in early 2008, while given the chance to pay his tax debt and associated fines.

See also
List of Puerto Ricans

References

1935 births
Living people
American people of Sephardic-Jewish descent
American television talk show hosts
People from Humacao, Puerto Rico
Puerto Rican male actors
Puerto Rican comedians
Puerto Rican television personalities
United States Army soldiers